Luis Ayesa Jr. (born 5 February 1950) is a Filipino former swimmer. He competed at the 1968 Summer Olympics and the 1972 Summer Olympics.

References

External links
 

1950 births
Living people
Filipino male swimmers
Olympic swimmers of the Philippines
Swimmers at the 1968 Summer Olympics
Swimmers at the 1972 Summer Olympics
Sportspeople from Manila